Gateway is an unincorporated community in Nevada County, California. It lies at an elevation of 5948 feet (1813 m).

References

Unincorporated communities in California
Unincorporated communities in Nevada County, California